The Paris Indians were a minor league baseball team based in Paris, Texas that played in the Big State League from 1952 to 1953. The club was managed by Red Davis and featured major leaguers Vicente Amor, Alex Carrasquel, Davis, Buck Frierson, Jim Kirby in 1952 and Red Barrett, Clarence Beers, Carrasquel, Davis, Frierson and Carlos Paula in 1953.

References

Defunct minor league baseball teams
Baseball teams established in 1952
Baseball teams disestablished in 1953
1952 establishments in Texas
1953 disestablishments in Texas
Defunct baseball teams in Texas